The Hyundai Porter (Hangul:현대 포터), also known as the Hyundai H-100, is a cabover truck produced by the South Korean manufacturer Hyundai since 1977.

History

First generation (1977–1981) 
The first generation, launched in January 1977, was called the Hyundai HD1000 and was available in both truck and minibus (3 and 12-seater van, ambulance) versions. The truck was called the Porter. The HD1000 was discontinued in 1981.

Second generation (1986–1996) 

In November 1986, Hyundai revived the label with the introduction of the second generation Porter, which was now a rebadged licensed second generation Mitsubishi Delica (L300). While the third generation Delica was also built by Hyundai, it was known as the Grace and was marketed only as a van, in parallel with the Porter truck range. It was built with the following body styles: 2-door truck, 4-door truck, 3-door van and 4-door van.

Upgrade

The upgraded second generation was a facelifted version of the second generation model. Round headlights, a steering wheel from the 1991 Sonata, and the dashboard from the newer Grace, were the main differences. In The Netherlands, it was called Hyundai H150.

The 1993 Porter was available with a regular cab, an extended cab, or a double cab. The diesel four-cylinder engine was called the Cyclone D4BX, a Hyundai-built version of Mitsubishi's 4D56 2.5 liter four-cylinder.

Third generation (1996–2003) 

The third generation, called the New Porter that based on Hyundai Grace, was launched in March 1996. It was built as a 2- and 4-door truck and a 3- and 4-door van. In South Africa, it was known as the Hyundai Bakkie. In The Netherlands, it was called Hyundai H150. In Malaysia, it was known as Inokom Lorimas. In Pakistan, it entered production in 1999 and was called the Hyundai Shehzore.

Fourth generation (2004–present) 

The fourth generation is called the Porter II. In South Korea, it is available in either a single-cab, extended-cab or double-cab models.

In January 2012, the facelifted Porter was launched in South Korea. Engine power was increased to 133 hp, 6-speed manual and 5-speed automatic transmissions replaced the former 5-speed manual and 4-speed automatic. Also the steering wheel design was updated. Safety features like airbags and reverse parking sensor were added. Convenience features such as steering wheel audio controls, a 7-inch navigation screen, hipass rear view mirror, Bluetooth handsfree were added.

In August 2013, a four-wheel drive variant was added to the lineup, available only with a manual transmission.

Due to the introduction of new regulations, tire pressure monitoring system, stability control and anti-lock braking became standard on every variant since 2015. But driver airbag is still optional instead of 4WD variant which doesn't offers driver airbag as option. Also, passenger side airbag and navigation option was added.

On August 26, 2016, euro 6 model was revealed. Beige color option was added and driver airbag get standard on every RWD variant. Passenger side airbag gets standard on top trim variants.

In 2016, the Porter was the best-selling vehicle in South Korea, with 44,696 vehicles delivered domestically through May 2016 (compared to 39,779 units of the Hyundai Avante in the same period). Globally, Hyundai sold 99,743 Porters in 2015.

In December 2019, a battery-electric version was launched in South Korea.

In October 2019, the Hyundai Class-1 Modern Jeepney in the Philippines, which is based on the H100, was released as part of the Public Utility Vehicle Modernization Program by the Philippine government.

Local names

Notes

See also
Mitsubishi Delica
Hyundai Grace
Kia Bongo

References

External links
(English)

Porter
Rear-wheel-drive vehicles
Cab over vehicles
Vehicles introduced in 1977